Games Convention is an annual video gaming event in Leipzig, Germany.

Game convention (and variants) may refer to:

Gaming convention, a multiple-day tabletop games gathering
Gamescom, an annual video game trade fair held in Cologne, Germany
GCA Games Convention Asia, a video game exhibition held in Singapore from 2007 to 2009

See also
List of gaming conventions